I Believe in You is the forty-sixth solo studio album and first children's album by American country music singer-songwriter Dolly Parton. It was released digitally on September 29, 2017, and physically on October 13, 2017, by Dolly Records and RCA Nashville. All proceeds from the album's sales will go to benefit Parton's Imagination Library.

Background
The album was originally announced on July 5, 2014, with the release of the title track, "I Believe in You", as a free download on Parton's official website. The release stated, "All families who receive the gift of Imagination Library books were also presented with a free download of Parton's song, "I Believe in You", that she wrote for the Imagination Playhouse at Dollywood. Eleven additional songs will soon be made available for purchase, with 100 percent of sales supporting the longevity of the Dollywood Foundation."

On October 18, 2016, Parton re-released her children's book, Coat of Many Colors, based on her hit song of the same name. This new version of the book featured new cover art and illustrations, as well as a free download of the song "Makin' Fun Ain't Funny". This version of the song features different instrumentation than the version featured on the album.

On August 15, 2017, Parton formally announced the album's upcoming release at a press conference at her management's Nashville office in front of reporters and their children, saying "I love kids and I am so excited. It just seems like the right time [to release a children's album]. Since I'm getting so old, I'm getting back into my second childhood." She also revealed the album's cover and track listing, as well as singing three songs from the album and reading a story to the children.

The album was made available for pre-order on September 15, 2017, along with the release of the album's title track, "I Believe in You".

Following the album's release, Parton released animated lyric videos for all thirteen of the album's tracks via her Vevo channel on November 17, 2017.

Critical reception

The album has received mixed to positive reviews from critics. James Christopher Monger of AllMusic felt that Parton's "effusive personality and seemingly ageless voice lend themselves well to the [children's] genre", that her "natural charisma and easy demeanor help keep things from becoming too cloying", and "with all proceeds from the album going to her bookworm charity, it's awfully hard to find fault with any of it." Elizabeth Andrews of The Spill Magazine judged Parton's first foray into children's music a successful one, and that the album "is a gift to share with parents, kids, the young at heart among us, and anyone needing a bit of a pick-me-up." Drowned in Sound however criticized the production of the album, saying it was "as counterfeit as much of Parton's idealised America has been throughout the years, and sounds like it was made on a Casio keyboard for the most part", nevertheless, "there's plenty for children to like about this album and it's hard to turn up the nose at the moral message which is at the core of the songs."

Commercial performance
The album debuted at number 11 on the Billboard Kid Albums chart, and peaked at number 3 in its third week. It also peaked at number 20 on the Billboard Top Country Albums chart in its third week, with 4,800 copies sold. It has sold 25,500 copies in the United States as of April 2018.

Track listing

Personnel
Adapted from the album liner notes.

Robert Behar – wardrobe
Paul Brannon – guitars
Dennis Carney – cheek kisses photo
Sarah Chapman – original graphic design
Paul T. Couch – executive producer
Richard Dennison – keyboards, producer, background vocals
Trey Fanjoy – cover photo
Vickie Hampton – background vocals
Tim Hayden – keyboards
Tom Hoey – drums, percussion
The Inner Child Chorus – background vocals
Shelley Jennings – background vocals
Melodie Kirkpatrick – background vocals
Chris Latham – edit engineer
Steve Mackey – bass
John Mayfield – mastering
Tom McBryde – producer
Shane McConnell – background vocals
Jennifer O'Brian – background vocals
Danny O'Lannerghty – bass
Dolly Parton – lead vocals, executive producer
Tom Reeves – mixing, engineering, drums
Cheryl Riddle – hair
Tom Rutledge – producer, engineering, edit engineer, acoustic guitar, bass, MIDI guitars
Nathan Smith – edit engineer
Steve Summers – wardrobe
Jacob Timmons – back cover photo, additional photography, original graphic design
Kent Wells – electric guitars

Charts

Release history

References

2017 albums
Dolly Parton albums